The International Disability and Development Consortium (IDDC) is a global consortium of disability and development related organisations.  The aim of IDDC is to promote inclusive development internationally, with a special focus on promoting human rights for all disabled people living in economically poor communities in lower and middle-income countries.

IDDC's work is primarily led by task groups where members collaborate to exchange views and ideas, and agree upon common strategies and positions.  These task groups are thus fundamental to the implementation of the IDDC objectives.

History 
In 1993, the Italian organization, Associazione Italiana Amici di Raoul Follereau, had been discussing the need for collaboration with the World Health Organization's Rehabilitation Unit – now the Disability and Rehabilitation Team – and decided to call a meeting of European NGOs who were involved in disability and leprosy programmes in countries in the South.  Eleven NGOs attended the first meeting and at a subsequent meeting in Oslo in 1994, the International Disability Consortium (IDC) was established with the aim of sharing information and expertise and to collaborate so that their work would be more effective and efficient.

Membership 
IDDC Currently has 23 full members:

 Action on Disability and Development
 Associazione Italiana Amici di Raoul Follereau
 Atlas Alliance
 Christian Blind Mission
 Disabled Peoples Organisations - Denmark
 Dutch Coalition on Disability and Development
 EU-CORD
 Finnish Disabled People's International Development Association
 Foundation Dark and Light
 Handicap International
 International Federation of Anti-Leprosy Associations
 Kupenda for the Children
 Leonard Cheshire Disability
 Light for the World
 Stichting Liliane Fonds
 Norwegian Association of Disabled
 Organismo di Volontariato per la Cooperazione Internazionale la Nostra Famiglia
 Platform Disability and Development Cooperation)
 Save the Children
 Sightsavers International
 Swedish Organisation of Disabled Persons International Aid Association
 The Leprosy Mission International
 Voluntary Service Overseas
 World Vision UK

References

External links

Disability rights organizations
International organisations based in Belgium